The National Science and Technology Forum (NSTF) is a non-profit company representing South African organisations in the public and private sector with an interest in science, engineering, technology, and innovation. Its aim is to promote science, engineering, and technology, and to engage with related government policies. Established in 1995, the NSTF organizes annual awards for research and development excellence in South Africa.

Membership 
There are more than 100 member organisations in six categories within the NSTF. These include:
 Eskom
 Federation of Unions of South Africa
 Health Department
 National Health Laboratory Service
 Rand Water
 South African Nuclear Energy Corporation
 Telecommunication Department

Notable award winners 
Amongst the notable South Africans who have received an award from the NSTF are:
 George Ellis
 Janice Limson
 Johann Lutjeharms
 Tshilidzi Marwala
 Tim Noakes

References

External links 
 NSTF website

1995 establishments in South Africa